RCA is Radio Corporation of America, a former American electronics company.

RCA may also refer to:

Radio Corporation of America
 RCA (trademark), owned by Technicolor SA since 1986
 RCA clean, for silicon wafers

Music
 RCA Camden
 RCA/Jive Label Group
 RCA Records
 RCA Red Seal Records
 RCA Studio B, a recording studio in Nashville, Tennessee, USA
 RCA Victrola

Sports
 Raed Club Arbaâ, an Algerian football club
 Racing Club Abidjan, an Ivorian football club
 Raja Club Athletic, a sports club in Casablanca, Morocco
 Rajasthan Cricket Association, India
 Rowing Canada Aviron, governing rowing
 Rwanda Cricket Association

Other organisations
 Rabbinical Council of America
 Radio Club Argentino
 Rail Cargo Austria, of Federal Railways
 Rajasthan Cricket Association, Jaipur, India
 Raleigh Christian Academy,  North Carolina, US
 Reformed Church in America
 Royal Cambrian Academy of Art, Conwy, Wales
 Royal Canadian Academy of Arts, Toronto, Ontario
 Royal College of Art, in London, England
 Royal Regiment of Canadian Artillery

Science and technology
 RCA connector, an electrical connector
 rca space, in mathematical set algebra
 RCA Studio II, a video game console
 Right coronary artery
 Riot control agent, tear gas
 Ripple-carry adder, a digital circuit
 Rolling circle amplification of DNA
 Root cause analysis, a problem solving method for networks
 RCA0, a weak axiom system in reverse mathematics

Places
 RCA Dome, a football stadium in Indianapolis, US
 Royal City Avenue, Bangkok, Thailand

Japan
 Ryoko Communications Association Co., Ltd. (RCA), later Japan Electronic Industries Development Association

Other uses
 Resource consumption accounting, an accounting methodology
 Revealed comparative advantage, an index in international economics

See also
 RCCA (disambiguation)